The 2015 Mini Challenge season was the fourteenth season of the Mini Challenge UK. The season started on 25 April at Donington Park and ended on 1 November at Snetterton Motor Racing Circuit. The season featured eight rounds across the UK. The 2015 season saw the introduction of the F56 Class which features the Gen-3 Mini.

Calendar

Entry list

Championship standings
Scoring system
Championship points were awarded for the first 32 positions in each Championship Race. Entries were required to complete 75% of the winning car's race distance in order to be classified and earn points. There were bonus points awarded for Pole Position and Fastest Lap.

Championship Race points

Drivers' Championship

F56 Class

JCW Class

Cooper Class

Mini Challenge UK
Mini Challenge UK